Glendon and Rushton railway station is a Grade II listed former railway station in Rushton, Northamptonshire.

History
Originally known as Rushton  it was opened in 1857 by the Midland Railway on what is now the Midland Main Line.

However the Midland, running to Rugby at that time and dependent on the LNWR for its path into London, was looking for an alternative. It revived its plans for Bedford to go forward to Hitchin to join the Great Northern Railway.

While initially solving the problem, traffic continued to build such that the line was quadrupled from London as far as Glendon Junction a little way to the south of the station.  Here a new line had been opened through Corby and Manton which could be used by goods trains and those for Nottingham., Thus the line through Glendon northwards was double track as far as Leicester.

It was renamed in 1896, possibly when Rushden opened in 1894 on the Wellingborough to Higham Ferrers line.

At grouping in 1923 it became part of the London Midland and Scottish Railway.

It closed on 4 January 1960 but the building still stands on the south side of the line.

Until 2006, the station building was subject to a statutory tenancy, and the daughter of the last Station Master lived there. In 2009 a group was formed, named the "Friends of Glendon and Rushton station", to restore the station which was granted Grade II listed status in 1981.

The station was subsequently converted for residential use and is now a private dwelling.

Stationmasters

George A. King ca. 1859 - ca. 1866
Henry Parr Jeffries ca. 1869
George Benner ca. 1870 - 1883 
George Latimer 1883 - 1919 (formerly station master at Barrow)
C. Marchant 1920 - ca. 1924 
Charles Leslie Smith ca. 1948
John Arthur Beswick from 1958 (formerly station master at Shenstone)

References

External links
Friends of Glendon and Rushton Station

Disused railway stations in Northamptonshire
Railway stations in Great Britain opened in 1857
Railway stations in Great Britain closed in 1960
Former Midland Railway stations
Charles Henry Driver railway stations
1857 establishments in England
North Northamptonshire
Grade II listed buildings in Northamptonshire
Grade II listed railway stations